This is a list of fellows of the Royal Society elected in its 17th year, 1676.

Fellows 
Sir Thomas Clutterbuck  (1627–1683)
Sir Richard Edgcumbe  (1640–1688)
Henry Hall  (1670–1692)
Sir Henry Sheers  (d. 1710)
John Mapletoft  (1631–1721)
Francesco Travagino  (b. 1613)
John King  (b. 1648)

References

1676
1676 in science
1676 in England